Italians are well known for their special attention to the preparation, the selection of the blends, and the use of accessories when creating many types of coffees. Many of the types of coffee preparation known today also have their roots here. The main coffee port in Italy is Trieste where there is also a lot of coffee processing industry. Italian coffee consumption, often espresso, is highest in the city of Trieste, with an average of 1500 cups of coffee per person per year. That is about twice as much as is usually drunk in Italy.

Caffè is the Italian word for coffee and probably originates from Kaffa, the region in Ethiopia where coffee originated. The Muslims first used and distributed it worldwide from the port of Mocha in Yemen, after which the Europeans named it mokka. Caffè may refer to the Italian way of preparing a coffee, an espresso, or occasionally used as a synonym for the European coffee bar.

Caffè espresso 

Normally, within the espresso bar environment, the term caffè denotes straight espresso. When one orders "un caffè" it is normally enjoyed at the bar, standing. The espresso is always served with a saucer and demitasse spoon, and sometimes with a complimentary wrapped chocolate and a small glass of water.

Caffettiera

Coffee maker 
The instrument used to prepare caffè at home, the caffettiera, is essentially a small steam machine made of a bottom boiler, a central filter which contains the coffee grounds, and an upper cup. In the traditional Moka pot, water is put in the boiler and the resulting boiling water passes through the coffee grounds, then reaches the cup. The Neapolitan caffettiera operates somewhat differently, and needs to be turned upside down when the drink is ready. Its boiler and cup are therefore interchangeable.

The quantity of coffee to be put in the filter determines the richness of the final beverage, but special care is needed in order not to block the water from crossing it, in case of an excess of grounds. Some hints prescribe that some small vertical holes are left in the powder by using a fork.

A small flame has to be used to provide an appropriate moderate water pressure; a high pressure makes the water run too quickly, resulting in coffee with little flavour. The flame under the caffettiera has to be turned off ten seconds after the first characteristic noise is heard, and eventually lit again in case the cup was not filled.

Coffee house 
A related but separate translation of the Italian caffetteria is coffee house or café: an establishment in which caffè was traditionally made with a Moka. These places became common in the 19th century specifically for enjoying caffè, while the habit of caffè drinking at home started at the beginning of the 20th century, when caffettiera machines (Mokas) became available to the general public.

In the older caffetterie (Italian, plural), frequented by the upper classes, art and culture events were held. So, many caffetterie acquired cultural importance (like Caffè Greco at 84 Via Condotti, Rome; or Caffè Florian in Venice, both established after the mid of the 18th Century ) and became famous meeting points of artists, intellectuals, politicians, etc. This caffetterie culture was mainly enjoyed by men, while women organised their tea meetings.

The traditional afternoon serving of caffè has an almost ceremonial formality: the caffè is always brought with a silver pot; porcelain cups (which should be fine china and as plainly decorated as possible) are served on a saucer with their small silver spoon on the right (on the saucer). Sugar is served separately, in porcelain pots, with a separate silver spoon. After taking caffè, smokers are usually allowed to light their cigarettes (the service typically includes a porcelain ashtray). If women are present, it is they who might grant the men permission to smoke. It is not usual to serve pastries or biscuits with afternoon caffè, but an exception can be made in case there are women at the table. The coffee pot has to be left on the table, for a second cup. After-lunch coffee is taken at separate smaller tables, not at the main one and children are not normally welcome to join adults in such formalities. In the 21st century, as smoking laws and local customs change, caffè drinking becomes less formal overall.

Since the early 2010s, Italy has seen a steady growth in the number of coffee houses serving specialty coffee, which cater to the growing local market for higher quality coffee.

Cappuccino is not related to traditional domestic coffee, being made with an espresso machine. Caffè-latte (also known as a latte in the U.S. and Café au lait in France) is made with a simple mixture of hot coffee and hot milk, and served in cups that are larger than tea cups. Caffetterie usually serve caffè-latte too.

Coffee house environments 
Like bars, coffee houses have a long history of offering environments in which people can easily socialize amongst their own groups and (often) with strangers. This is reflected in language; when people say "meet for coffee," they primarily mean meet to socialize or talk. Historically, coffee houses have been places where people gather, chat, work, write (in particular, the writing of local newspapers), read (in particular, the same local newspapers that were written in coffee houses) and pass the time. Today, coffee houses are much the same—it's merely that ink and paper have been often replaced with laptops and newspapers have been replaced by blogs.

The layouts of coffee houses often include smaller nooks and larger, more communal areas. In a more crowded coffee house, it is common for strangers to sit at the same table, even if that table only seats two people. Coffee houses are typically cozy, which encourages communication amongst strangers.

Types of Italian coffee 
The variety of coffee types in Italy is enormous and, while about 20 types of coffee are popular all over Italy, many regional varieties do exist.

Among the most popular Italian coffees are the standard espresso, the ristretto (a shorter espresso), the double espresso, the macchiato (espresso stained with milk), the marocchino (espresso, chocolate syrup, milk and cocoa), the cappuccino (espresso with whipped milk foam), the caffelatte (coffee and milk in similar quantities), the affogato (a ball of ice cream showered with espresso), the shakerato (a long espresso mixed with ice and strained), the caffè ginseng (black coffee mixed with extract of ginseng), the cappuccino matcha (cappuccino where matcha is used instead of coffee), the caffè d'orzo (barley coffee) and the caffè con panna (coffee with whipped cream).

References

External links 
 Specialty coffee in Italy Specialty coffee cafes and roasters in Italy

See also

Manufacturers of coffee 
 Caffè Pascucci
 Guglielmo coffee
 illy
 Lavazza
 Massimo Zanetti Beverage Group

Espresso machine 
 Bialetti
 Cimbali
 De'Longhi
 Elektra (espresso machines)
 Faema
 FrancisFrancis
 Gaggia
 La Marzocco
 Rancilio
 Saeco

 
Coffee preparation
Italian drinks
Italian words and phrases